The porte Désilles (or mémorial Désilles) is a memorial gate in the French city of Nancy. It is considered to be the oldest War memorial in France.

It is located on place du Luxembourg, on the northern extension of cours Léopold and the esplanade du Souvenir-Français, at the junction of rue Désilles, rue de Metz and rue de la Craffe. It was built between 1782 and 1784 to designs by the architect Didier-Joseph-François Mélin on the initiative of the Comte de Stainville, commander in chief of Lorraine.

This monument was intended to close the view at the end of cours Léopold and to open a view out onto the route de Metz, as well as to provide a memorial to citizens of Nancy who had died in the American Revolutionary War, specifically during the Siege of Yorktown (1781).

Its name was initially porte Saint-Louis, then porte Stainville, and finally took its present name in memory of André Désilles and his death in the Nancy affair. It was made a monument historique on 15 January 1925.

Terminating vistas in France
Triumphal arches in France
Buildings and structures in Nancy, France
Tourist attractions in Nancy, France
1784 establishments in France
Buildings and structures completed in 1784
18th-century architecture in France